
Fairy tales are stories that range from those in folklore to more modern stories defined as literary fairy tales. Despite subtle differences in the categorizing of fairy tales, folklore, fables, myths, and legends, a modern definition of the fairy tale, as provided by Jens Tismar's monologue in German, is a story that differs "from an oral folk tale", written by "a single identifiable author", which can be characterized as "simple and anonymous", and exists in a mutable and difficult to define genre with a close relationship to folktales.

Non-categorized

Afghanistan

Africa

Albania

Arabic

Armenia

Asia (East Asia)  

Well-known Japanese "fairy tale" are often found in the Otogi-zōshi or the Konjaku Monogatarishū.

Asia (Southeast Asia)

Australia

Azerbaijan

Baltic

Belgium

Canada

Celtic

Chile

England

Finland

France

Georgia

Germany 

Germany and German-speaking Austria, Switzerland, etc.

Greece

Hungary

Iberian Peninsula

India  
Indian subcontinent.

Indonesia

Iran

Ireland

Isle of Man

Italy

Lebanon

Mexico

New Zealand

Nicaragua

Scandinavia  

Hans Christian Andersen's works may be considered "literary fairytales.

Romania

Russia

Slavic

Scotland

Turkey

United States

Uzbekistan

Venezuela

Wales

Explanatory notes

See also
 Slovenian fairy tales (sl)

References 
Citations

Bibliography

External links
Celtic Folklore at Sacred Text Archives
Ancient Legends, Mystic Charms, and Superstitions of Ireland at Library Ireland
European Folktales at World of Tales
Fairy Tales and Folklore at Gutenberg
Fairy Tales, Fables and Folk Tales 

Fairy tales
 
Fairy tales
Fairy tales
Fairy tales

es:Anexo:Cuentos infantiles